Waitea Abiuta was one of the first converts to the Church of Jesus Christ of Latter-day Saints (LDS Church) in Kiribati and was the first i-Kiribati leader in the LDS Church.

In 1972, Abiuta was the headmaster of a primary school in Tarawa. He wrote letters to secondary schools around the world asking if his students could attend for further education. The LDS Church's Liahona High School in Tonga received one of the letters and admitted 12 of Abiuta's students in 1973. While in Tonga, all 12 of these students joined the LDS Church and six became Mormon missionaries in 1975. While assigned to the Fiji Suva Mission of the church, the missionaries returned to Kiribati to preach Mormonism.

Abiuta was one of the first converts of the i-Kiribati missionaries. On 24 January 1976, Kenneth Palmer, the president of the Fiji Suva Mission, appointed Abiuta as the first branch president of the LDS Church in Kiribati. The LDS Church later purchased Abiuta's school and named it Moroni Community School; when it changed from a primary to a secondary school it was renamed Moroni High School.

References
R. Lanier Britsch, “On the Pacific Frontier: The Church in the Gilbert Islands,” Ensign, October 1981, p. 28
R. Lanier Britsch (1986). Unto the Islands of the Sea: A History of the Latter-day Saints in the Pacific (Salt Lake City, Utah: Deseret Book) pp. 515–521
Joyce Findlay, “Kiribati Flowers in the Pacific,” Ensign, December 1997, pp. 68–70
W. James Jacob, "Kiribati", in Arnold K. Garr, Donald Q. Cannon, and Richard O. Cowan (eds., 2000) Encyclopedia of Latter-day Saint History (Salt Lake City, Utah: Deseret Book) pp. 616–617

Converts to Mormonism
I-Kiribati educators
I-Kiribati leaders of the Church of Jesus Christ of Latter-day Saints
Year of birth missing (living people)
People from the Gilbert Islands
Living people